Phytomyza multifidae is a species of leaf miner fly in the family Agromyzidae.

References

Phytomyza
Articles created by Qbugbot
Insects described in 1971